Isaac Likekele (born February 25, 2000) is an American college basketball player for the Ohio State Buckeyes of the Big Ten Conference. He previously played at Oklahoma State.

Early life and high school career
Likekele was born in Charlotte, North Carolina to Sarah and Serge Likekele. He attended Mansfield Timberview High School, where in his senior year averaged 18 points, 9 rebounds and 5 assists per game. In 2017, Likekele led his team to the Texas 5A state championship. A three-star prospect, he was accepted to attend Oklahoma State University in May 2018.

College career

Oklahoma State
As a freshman at Oklahoma State, Likekele averaged 8.7 points, 4.8 rebounds and 3.9 assists per game. In November 2019, Oklahoma State won the NIT Season Tip-Off against Ole Miss; Likekele was named to the All-Tournament Team. Despite missing most of December with an illness, Likekele posted three triple-doubles and had 21 points in the Big 12 Tournament first round win over Iowa State. In the 2019–20 season he played 28 games and started all of them, averaging 10.9 points, 5.6 rebounds and a team-high 4.5 assists per game. Likekele was named All-Big 12 Honorable Mention.

Ohio State
On May 4, 2022, Likelele announced on Twitter that he was transferring to Ohio State.

National team career
Likekele won a gold medal with the United States at the 2019 FIBA Under-19 Basketball World Cup in Heraklion. He averaged 8.4 points, 5.9 rebounds and 3.1 assists per game.

Career statistics

College

|-
| style="text-align:left;"| 2018–19
| style="text-align:left;"| Oklahoma State
| 32 || 32 || 28.9 || .466 || .240 || .657 || 4.8 || 3.9 || 1.3 || .3 || 8.7
|-
| style="text-align:left;"| 2019–20
| style="text-align:left;"| Oklahoma State
| 28 || 28 || 32.4 || .460 || .214 || .661 || 5.6 || 4.5 || 1.9 || .4 || 10.9
|-
| style="text-align:left;"| 2020–21
| style="text-align:left;"| Oklahoma State
| 24 || 20 || 33.8 || .482 || .444 || .570 || 6.6 || 3.6 || 1.1 || .2 || 9.1
|- class="sortbottom"
| style="text-align:center;" colspan="2"| Career
| 84 || 80 || 31.5 || .468 || .298 || .635 || 5.6 || 4.0 || 1.5 || .3 || 9.6

Personal life
Likekele marks both of his sneakers with a black marker in honor of his deceased grandfather, his friend Criston King (who died in an automobile accident), and best friend John Lee. Likekele says, "Me going out there and playing like that is paying respects to them...". Likekele has two sisters, Faith and Hope.

References

External links
Oklahoma State Cowboys bio
USA Basketball bio

2000 births
Living people
African-American basketball players
Basketball players from Texas
Oklahoma State Cowboys basketball players
Point guards
Sportspeople from Arlington, Texas
Olympic gold medalists for the United States in basketball
21st-century African-American sportspeople
20th-century African-American sportspeople